Trino Arizcorreta Sein (born 7 October 1902, date of death unknown) was a Spanish footballer. He competed in the men's tournament at the 1928 Summer Olympics. He played club football for Real Sociedad in La Liga.

References

External links
 
 

1902 births
Year of death missing
Spanish footballers
Spain international footballers
Olympic footballers of Spain
Footballers at the 1928 Summer Olympics
Association football midfielders
Footballers from San Sebastián
Real Sociedad footballers
La Liga players